Pilot Officer Sydney "Timbertoes" Carlin,  (18899 May 1941) was a British World War I flying ace, despite having previously lost a leg during the Battle of the Somme. He returned to the Royal Air Force in World War II, serving as an air gunner during the Battle of Britain.

Early life
Sydney Carlin was born in Kingston upon Hull, Yorkshire, the son of William Carlin, a drysalter. By 1901 he was a boarder at a small private school in the village of Soulby, Kirkby Stephen, Westmorland. He enlisted with the 18th Hussars (later the 18th Royal Hussars) in 1908, but he bought himself out and resigned in December 1909 for the sum of £18. In 1911 he was working as a farm labourer at Frodingham Grange, North Frodingham, Yorkshire.

World War I
Just over a year after the British entry into World War I, he re-enlisted on 8 August 1915; the army refunded half (£9) of the money he had bought himself out with in 1909. Serving in Belgium with the 18th Royal Hussars he was awarded the Distinguished Conduct Medal on 5 August 1915, and was later commissioned as a second lieutenant in September 1915 and made a lieutenant in May 1916. He lost a leg serving in the Battle of Longueval/Delville Wood, on the Somme in 1916, while commanding a Royal Engineers Field Company section holding a trench against repeated German counter-attacks. For this action he was awarded the Military Cross in October.

Extraordinarily, he joined the Royal Flying Corps in 1917, following his recovery. On 12 March 1918, Carlin was seconded from the Royal Engineers to the RFC. After serving as an instructor at the Central Flying School, he was posted in May 1918 to No. 74 Squadron RAF flying S.E.5As, where he earned his nickname "Timbertoes". Carlin is recorded as an ace balloon buster, with five balloons downed; he was also an ace against aircraft, with four machines claimed destroyed, and one aircraft 'driven down out of control'. His exploits earned him the Distinguished Flying Cross.

On 9 August 1918 Lieutenant Carlin was promoted to temporary captain. In early September he was involved in a mid-air collision with his commanding officer, Major Keith Caldwell, but was relatively unscathed.

On 21 September Carlin was shot down over Hantay by Unteroffizier Siegfried Westphal of Jasta 29 and held as a prisoner of war. He was repatriated on 13 December 1918 and admitted to the RAF Central Hospital on Christmas Day 1918. Carlin relinquished his commission on "account of ill-health contracted on active service" on 7 August 1919. and retained the rank of lieutenant.

Inter-war years
On 1 January 1924 Carlin was promoted from flight lieutenant to squadron leader. Nevertheless, in 1924, Carlin departed Britain for Mombasa aboard the SS Madura.  He was listed on the passenger list as an "agriculturist". He farmed for some years in Kenya.

From 20 May 1931 to 8 August 1935 Carlin served as the justice of the peace for Kisumu-Londiani District, Kenya.

World War II
On re-enlistment to the RAF he was graded as a probationary pilot officer on 27 July 1940, almost eleven months after the outbreak of the Second World War. He made pilot officer in September 1940, flying as an air gunner in Boulton Paul Defiant aircraft with No. 264 Squadron RAF and later No. 151 Squadron RAF. He also made several unofficial trips as an air gunner with No. 311 (Czech) Squadron, flying Wellingtons.

Carlin was injured in action at RAF Wittering during an enemy bombing raid on 7/8 May 1941, and died in Peterborough on 9 May 1941. He is commemorated on the Screen Wall, Panel 1, at Hull Crematorium.

References

External links

1889 births
1941 deaths
The Few
18th Royal Hussars soldiers
Military personnel from Kingston upon Hull
Royal Flying Corps officers
Royal Air Force officers
British Army personnel of World War I
Royal Air Force personnel of World War I
British World War I flying aces
Recipients of the Military Cross
Recipients of the Distinguished Flying Cross (United Kingdom)
Recipients of the Distinguished Conduct Medal
Royal Air Force personnel killed in World War II
Shot-down aviators
Royal Engineers officers
Deaths by airstrike during World War II
Royal Air Force Volunteer Reserve personnel of World War II
English amputees
English expatriates in Kenya